Miu Miu is an Italian high fashion women's clothing and accessory brand and a fully owned subsidiary of Prada. It is headed by Miuccia Prada and headquartered in Paris, France.

History

Miu Miu was established in 1992 by Miuccia Prada. The name was conceived from Miuccia Prada's family nickname. It was publicly launched in 1993, with a cowgirl-themed collection of fringed suede jackets and patchwork prairie skirts. Starting in 1994, the brand showed its collections in the US for three seasons. It first showed a womenswear collection during Paris Fashion Week in 2006.

By 2005, Prada worked on distinguishing Miu Miu by setting up a separate showroom for the brand in an Art Nouveau villa that served as Prada’s first Milan headquarters, and using that same location for the men’s fall-winter show in 2006.  

Backed by a 2013 agreement between Coty Inc. and Prada, Miu Miu launched its first fragrance in 2015, marking the first time the brand expanded outside the fashion and accessories markets.

In 2020, Miu Miu introduced Upcycled by Miu Miu, a limited collection of vintage dresses from the 1940s through the 1970s that have been tweaked and refashioned.

Boutiques 

There are Miu Miu boutiques located on a global scale. Architect Roberto Baciocchi developed the blueprint for an early series of stores, which was first applied to the Milan store in 2006. He also created the interiors for Miu Miu stores in Paris, Hong Kong, Florence, London, New York and Taipei.

Miu Miu opened its first independent store in China in The Mixc in Shenzhen in 2009. A new North American store was launched in Houston, Texas, in The Galleria during the summer of 2011 and in Short Hills, New Jersey, in the fall of 2011. Miu Miu also opened their first Australian boutique at Chadstone Shopping Centre in Melbourne. A branch opened in Glasgow, Scotland, in 2010 and is situated in the Fraser's department store. A store designed by Herzog & de Meuron opened in the Aoyama district of Tokyo in 2015.

In 2017 the Miu Miu Sloane Street store in London reopened after a refurbishment, and announced that they would be starting a customisation service to allow customers to design their own heels. It is the only Miu Miu store in the world to offer this service.

Advertising
Spokes-models for the brand have included Laetitia Casta, Kirsten Dunst, Maggie Gyllenhaal, Katie Holmes, Ginta Lapina, Lindsay Lohan, Vanessa Paradis, Chloë Sevigny, Siri Tollerod, Lindsey Wixson, Zhou Xun, Dong Jie, Jessica Stam and Joan Smalls. In May 2011, Miu Miu appointed the (then only fourteen-year-old) actress Hailee Steinfeld to be the new younger face of the brand. For the 2012 campaign, a 34-year-old, U.S. model Guinevere Van Seenus was chosen. In 2018, actress Elle Fanning became the face of the brand.
In 2021, South Korean singer and actress Im Yoona was selected as the brand ambassador.

In 2011, Miu Miu launched the Women's Tales series. The campaign consisted of short films that were produced in conjunction with high-profile female directors. The outcome was a list of short, silent films that featured Miu Miu's collections. The first four short films were directed by Zoe Cassavetes, Lucrecia Martel, Giada Colagrande and Massy Tadjedin and were screened at the 69th Venice International Film Festival. A fifth film that debut in 2013, was written and directed by Ava DuVernay and also starred.

Controversies
On March 14, 2013, a counter report of Prada in violating women's rights was reported to Office of the United Nations High Commissioner for Human Rights Committee on Economic, Social and Cultural Rights. On May 17, 2013, a statement against sexual harassment and gender discrimination at workplace was released by the UN Committee. In April 2013, an American Change.org petition against Miuccia Prada, collected over 200K signatures around the world. This petition was against Miuccia Prada for countersuing a fired employee for making false statements while voicing her opinion against sexual harassment. This petition damaged the brand image. On May 28, 2013, The UN has backed former Prada employee Bovrisse over the sexual harassment and discrimination  case of Prada Japan. Vogue launched a news article, "Prada Vs The UN" quoting Bovrisse claiming, "Anyone who buys from the Prada and Miu Miu brands are supporting a culture of discrimination and power harassment."

In 2015, the UK’s Advertising Standards Authority banned a double-page Miu Miu ad that ran in British Vogue, after having received a complaint that the image looked as if a child had been dressed as an adult in a sexually suggestive pose which was irresponsible and offensive.

References

External links
 Official website

 Short info about Miu Miu Fashion Shows, Runway Collections and Fashion Tv
High fashion brands
Clothing brands of Italy
Privately held companies of Italy
Luxury brands
Fashion accessory brands
Clothing companies established in 1993
Italian companies established in 1993
Companies based in Milan
Eyewear brands of Italy
Prada

fr:Prada#Miu Miu